IRI Freedom Award is the annual award "to honor individuals who have worked to advance freedom and democracy in their countries and around the world" established by the International Republican Institute in 1995.

Recipients

References

Humanitarian and service awards
Awards established in 1995